Rockland Farm may refer to:

Rockland Farm (Hagerstown, Maryland), listed on the NRHP in Maryland 
Rockland Farm (Westminster, Maryland), listed on the NRHP in Maryland